Bram may refer to:

People
 Bram (given name)
 Bram (surname)
 Bram (wrestler) (born 1986), ring name of professional wrestler Thomas Raymond Latimer
 Bram Tchaikovsky (born 1950), stage name of British musician Peter Bramall
 Bram Stoker Irish author of Dracula

Other uses
 Bram, Aude, a commune in France
 Gare de Bram, Bram, Occitanie, France
 Stade du Bram, a stadium in Louhans, France
 Bram, nickname of the lead character in the 2012 Dutch Film Brammetje Baas

See also
 
 Brahm (disambiguation)
 Brams, a surname
 CBRAM, conductive-bridging RAM